The Grammy Award for Best Gospel Vocal Performance, Female was awarded in from 1984 to 1990.  From 1984 to 1989 it was titled the Grammy Award for Best Gospel Performance, Female.

Years reflect the year in which the Grammy Awards were presented, for works released in the previous year.

Recipients

See also

 List of music awards honoring women

References

External links
 Official site

Grammy Awards for gospel music
Music awards honoring women